Bob Mazie (March 29, 1938 – January 5, 2017) was an American football coach. He was the head football coach at Kutztown University of Pennsylvania for one season in 1972.

Mazie then served as the head football coach at Southwestern Oklahoma State University from 1978 to 1985. During his time at Southwestern Oklahoma State, he coached two future National Football League (NFL) coaches, Rex Ryan and Rob Ryan.

Head coaching record

College

References

1938 births
2017 deaths
Dayton Flyers football coaches
Kutztown Golden Bears football coaches
Southern Illinois Salukis football coaches
Southwestern Oklahoma State Bulldogs football coaches
Waynesburg Yellow Jackets football coaches
Sportspeople from Pittsburgh